During the 1920–21 season Hibernian, a football club based in Edinburgh, finished thirteenth out of 22 clubs in the Scottish Football League.

Scottish Football League

Final League table

Scottish Cup

See also
List of Hibernian F.C. seasons

References

External links
Hibernian 1920/1921 results and fixtures, Soccerbase

Hibernian F.C. seasons
Hibernian